Iron(II) tetrafluoroborate or ferrous tetrafluoroborate is an inorganic chemical with chemical formula Fe(BF4)2. Both the anhydrous form and a hexahydrate are known. The hexahydrate and aqueous solutions are green. Tetrafluoroborate is generally a weakly coordinating anion, so iron(II) tetrafluoroborate is used as the starting material for forming various other iron(II) coordination complexes.

For example, a complex composed of iron(II) tetrafluoroborate and the ligand tris[2-(diphenylphosphino)-ethyl]phosphine catalyzes the transfer hydrogenation of various aldehydes to give the corresponding primary alcohols, using formic acid as hydrogen donor.

References

Iron(II) compounds
Tetrafluoroborates